Busan Metro Line 1 is the north-south route of the Busan Metro. But with Line 1 going to regions such as Jagalchi Station, Busan Station, Seomyeon Station, Dongnae Station, and Nopo Station, it is deemed the most popular line of all of the Busan Metro system. Line 1 uses 8-car trains. The line color is orange.

History
Plans to create this line began in 1979. In 2009, Busan Transportation Corporation planned to complete the fifth section extension of the metro line by late 2013, but later on postponed it to November 2016.

1980s
 June 13, 1981: Constructed the first section from Beomnaegol Station (118) to Nopo Station (134).
 July 28, 1983: Constructed the second section from Jungang Station (112) to Beomnaegol Station (118).
 August 14, 1984: Constructed the third section from Seodaesin Station (107) to Jungang Station (112).
 July 19, 1985: Opened the first section service from Beomnaegol Station (118) to Beomeosa Station (133).
 December 19, 1986 : Opened the first section service for Nopo Station (134).
 May 15, 1987: Opened the second section service from Jungang Station (112) to Beomnaegol Station (118).
 May 19, 1988: Opened the third section service from Toseong Station (109) to Jungang Station (112).

1990s
 February 28, 1990: Opened the third section service from Seodaesin Station (107) to Toseong Station (109).
 July 24, 1990: Constructed the fourth section from Sinpyeong Station (101) to Seodaesin Station (107).
 June 23, 1994: Opened the fourth section from Sinpyeong Station (101) to Seodaesin Station (107).

2000s
 November 20, 2009: Began construction for the fifth section from Dadae Station to Sinpyeong Station (101).

2010s
 February 24, 2010: Seodaesin (107), Dongdaesin (108), Toseong (109), Nampo (111), Jungang (112), Choryang (114), Jwacheon (116), Beomil (117), Bujeon (120), Yeonsan (123), Myeongnyun (126), Jangjeon (129), Guseo (130), Namsan (132), and (134) Nopo stations were renamed by removing the 'dong' at the end.
 April 20, 2017:  Opened the fifth section service from Dadaepo Beach Station (095) to Sinpyeong Station (101).

Hours of operation
The hours of operation of Line 1 start at 5:05 for the ride from Sinpyeong to Nopo at Sinpyeong Station and 5:10 for Nopo to Sinpyeong at Nopo Station. The hours end with the last trains arriving in Sinpyeong at 00:35 and Nopo at 00:30. A ride through the entire line takes about 1 hour 2 minutes.

List of stations

References

External links

Busan Metro: Busan city official website
Busan Subway Transit Search

Railway lines opened in 1985
1
1985 establishments in South Korea